Galați TV Tower is a  tall concrete tower used for FM and TV broadcasting in Galați, Romania. The tower, completed in 1978, is equipped with a tower restaurant, perhaps the only of this kind in Romania.

External links 
 http://skyscraperpage.com/cities/?buildingID=78275

Towers in Romania
Buildings and structures in Galați
Transmitter sites in Romania

Towers completed in 1978
1978 establishments in Romania